Spermodea is a genus of minute, European, air-breathing land snails, terrestrial pulmonate gastropod molluscs, or micromolluscs, in the family Valloniidae.

Species
Species within the genus Spermodea include:
 Spermodea lamellata (Jeffreys, 1830)

References

Valloniidae